Southern Pirkanmaa  is a subdivision of Pirkanmaa and one of the Sub-regions of Finland since 2009.

Municipalities
 Akaa
 Urjala
 Valkeakoski

Politics
Results of the 2018 Finnish presidential election:

 Sauli Niinistö   64.2%
 Pekka Haavisto   9.4%
 Laura Huhtasaari   9.1%
 Paavo Väyrynen   6.0%
 Tuula Haatainen   4.8%
 Merja Kyllönen   3.4%
 Matti Vanhanen   2.8%
 Nils Torvalds   0.4%

Sub-regions of Finland
Geography of Pirkanmaa